Martina Rizzelli (born March 24, 1998) is an Italian female artistic gymnast and a member of the national team. She participated in two editions of the World Championships (2014 in Nanjing, China, and 2015 in Glasgow, Scotland), and qualified for the 2016 Summer Olympics.

References

External links 
 
 Martina Rizzelli at the Italian Olympic Committee (CONI)

1998 births
Living people
Italian female artistic gymnasts
Sportspeople from Como
Gymnasts at the 2016 Summer Olympics
Olympic gymnasts of Italy
Universiade medalists in gymnastics
Universiade bronze medalists for Italy
Medalists at the 2019 Summer Universiade
21st-century Italian women